Eolepidopterigoidea is an extinct superfamily of moths, containing the single family Eolepidopterigidae, although the genus Undopterix is sometimes placed in a separate family Undopterigidae. The type-genus of the family is Eolepidopterix.

Genera 

 †Aclemus Zhang et al. 2016 Daohugou, China, Callovian
 †Akainalepidopteron Zhang, Shih, Labandeira & Ren in Zhang et al., 2013  Daohugou, China, Callovian
 †Netoxena Sohn in Sohn et al., 2012 Crato Formation, Brazil, Aptian
 †Daiopterix Skalski, 1984 Glushkovo Formation, Russia, Tithonian
 †Dynamilepidopteron Zhang, Shih, Labandeira & Ren in Zhang et al., 2013 Daohugou, China, Callovian
 †Psamateia Martins-Neto, 2002 Crato Formation, Brazil, Aptian
 †Palaeolepidopterix Kozlov 1989 Karabastau Formation, Kazakhtstan, Callovian/Oxfordian
 †Gracilepteryx Martins-Neto and Vulcano, 1989 Crato Formation, Brazil, Aptian
 †Eolepidopterix Rasnitsyn, 1983 Uda Formation, Russia, Oxfordian
 †Undopterix Skalski, 1979  Glushkovo Formation, Russia, Tithonian Crato Formation, Brazil, Aptian
 †Grammikolepidopteron Zhang, Shih, Labandeira & Ren in Zhang et al., 2013 Daohugou, China, Callovian
 †Longcapitalis Zhang, Shih, Labandeira & Ren in Zhang et al., 2013 Daohugou, China, Callovian
 †Petilicorpus Zhang, Shih, Labandeira & Ren in Zhang et al., 2013 Daohugou, China, Callovian
 †Quadruplecivena Zhang, Shih, Labandeira & Ren in Zhang et al., 2013 Daohugou, China, Callovian
 †Seresilepidopteron Zhang, Shih, Labandeira & Ren in Zhang et al., 2013 Daohugou, China, Callovian

References

 
Lepidoptera superfamilies
Fossil Lepidoptera